Giovanni Malagò (born 13 March 1959) is an Italian businessman, sports manager, and former futsal player. He is the president of the Italian National Olympic Committee (CONI). Since 1 January 2019, he is a member of the International Olympic Committee.

Life and career 
Born in Rome, Malagò practiced since his youth different sports and notably futsal, in which discipline he won 3 league titles with Roma RCB and in 1986 he attended with the national team the World Cup in Brazil. After graduating in economics, he became CEO of Samocar, a car sales company founded by his father Vincenzo in 1977. As a sports manager he became chairman of the sports club Aniene Rowing Club in 1997 and then he was chairman of the organizing committee of the Italian Open of tennis.

In 2000, Malagò became a member of the Executive of the Italian National Olympic Committee, dealing with many international sporting events organized in Italy, such as the European Volleyball Championship in 2005 and the World Swimming Championships in 2009. On 19 February 2013 he was resoundingly elected President of CONI against Raffaele Pagnozzi, secretary general of the Committee since 1993, who had the support of the outgoing President Gianni Petrucci and of the major sports federations including the Italian Football Federation. Malagò currently leads the organizing committee of the 2026 Winter Olympics in Milan and Cortina d'Ampezzo.

See also
Circolo Canottieri Aniene

References

External links
 

1959 births
Living people
Italian men's futsal players
Businesspeople from Rome
Sportspeople from Rome
Sports managers
International Olympic Committee members
Presidents of the Organising Committees for the Olympic Games